Stephany Dianne Damondamon Stefanowitz (born 3 October 1989) is a Filipino-German model, Fashion Designer, Host, Singer, Beauty Queen and Environmental Advocate from Manila, Philippines. She competed in the 12th edition of the national Miss Philippines Earth beauty pageant where she emerged as the winner and was crowned Miss Philippines Earth 2012 and competed internationally in the Miss Earth 2012 and won Miss Earth Air 2012. She is corporate, TV, and pageant host in the Philippines.

Miss Philippines Earth 2012
Stefanowitz joined and represented Quezon City in the national Miss Philippines Earth 2012, the largest and most widely participated beauty pageant in the Philippines with 47 official candidates participated in 2012. As a beauty titleholder, she fulfills her duty as one of the spokespersons of the Miss Earth Foundation, an environmental-social-humanitarian outreach arm of Miss Earth beauty pageant.

In the final competition of the Miss Philippines Earth 2012, she competed and achieved one of the five highest scores in the swimsuit, and evening gown competitions for her stage chops and question and answer portion of the pageant. At the conclusion of the pageant, she won and was crowned Miss Philippines Earth 2012. She was crowned by the outgoing Miss Philippines Earth 2011 titleholder, Athena Imperial on 27 May 2012. She also won the Best in Evening Gown award and one of the Best in Runway and Best in Styling.

Personal
Stefanowitz studied in De La Salle Santiago Zobel and furthered her studies in De La Salle–College of Saint Benilde where she took up and Fashion Design and Merchandising (AB-FDM) and graduated in 2011. Stefanowitz also received a De La Salle Loyalty Award. Her mother is from Butuan and her father is from Hamburg, Germany.

Television

References

External links
Official Miss Earth website
Miss Earth Foundation website

Living people
1989 births
Filipino people of German descent
Star Magic
Miss Philippines Earth winners
Miss Earth 2012 contestants
People from Quezon City
People from Butuan